The Syria Accountability and Lebanese Sovereignty Restoration Act (SALSRA,) is a bill of the United States Congress passed into law on December 12, 2003.

The bill's stated purpose is to end what the United States sees as Syrian support for terrorism, to end Syria's presence in Lebanon, which has been in effect since the end of the Lebanese Civil War in 1990, to stop Syria's alleged development of WMDs, to cease Syria's illegal importation of Iraqi oil and to end illegal shipments of military items to anti-US forces in Iraq.

The bill was sponsored by Representative Eliot L. Engel (D) from New York and was introduced April 12, 2003.

2013 Ghouta chemical attack
In response to the use of chemical weapons against civilians during the 2013 Ghouta chemical attack, president Barack Obama asked Congress to authorize the use of military force against Syria. An early draft of that authorization cites the Syria Accountability Act, saying:
Whereas in the Syria Accountability and Lebanese Sovereignty Restoration Act of 2003, Congress found that Syria’s acquisition of weapons of mass destruction threatens the security of the Middle East and the national security interests of the United States.

See also
Pax Syriana

References

External links
The full text of the act
Statement of President Bush upon signing the bill from georgewbush-whitehouse.archives.gov

Syria–United States relations
2003 in Syria
2003 in international relations
2003 in Lebanon
Counterterrorism in the United States
Arab–Israeli conflict
Terrorism laws in the United States
Terrorism in Syria
United States foreign relations legislation
Sanctions legislation
Acts of the 108th United States Congress
United States sanctions

Michel Aoun